Chuvilevsky is a rural locality (a khutor) in Nizhneosinovskoye Rural Settlement, Surovikinsky District, Volgograd Oblast, Russia. The population was 227 as of 2010.

Geography 
Chuvilevsky is located in the valley of the Chir River, 15 km southwest of Surovikino (the district's administrative centre) by road. Novoderbenovsky is the nearest rural locality.

References 

Rural localities in Surovikinsky District